2-Oleoylglycerol (2OG) is a monoacylglycerol that is found in biologic tissues. Its synthesis is derived from diacylglycerol precursors. It is metabolized to oleic acid and glycerol primarily by the enzyme monoacylglycerol lipase (MAGL). In 2011, 2OG was found to be an endogenous ligand to GPR119.  2OG has been shown to increase glucagon-like peptide-1 (GLP-1) and gastric inhibitory polypeptide (GIP) levels following administration to the small intestine.

See also
2-Arachidonoylglycerol
JZL184

References

Fatty acid esters
Lipids
Endocannabinoids